A Night at the Opera may refer to:

 A Night at the Opera (film) (1935), a Marx Brothers comedy film
 A Night at the Opera (Queen album) (1975), by rock band Queen
 A Night at the Opera (Blind Guardian album) (2002), by power metal band Blind Guardian
 A Night at the Opera (chess), a famous chess game played during an opera, in which Paul Morphy defeated Duke Karl II of Brunswick and Count Isouard
 "A Night at the Opera", an episode of the television series Never the Twain
 "A Night at the Opera", a TV special stand-up comedy show by comedian Jackie Mason.

Night at the opera may refer to:
 Initial states of the Belgian Revolution of 1830